Dolphins of the Sea is a bronze sculpture by Katharine Lane Weems, installed outside the New England Aquarium on Boston's Central Wharf, in the U.S. state of Massachusetts. The sculpture depicts a school of swimming dolphins and measures approximately 4× 3× 7 ft. It was copyrighted in 1977. The work was surveyed by the Smithsonian Institution's "Save Outdoor Sculpture!" program in 1997.

See also

 1977 in art

References

External links
 Dolphins – Boston, MA at Waymarking

1977 sculptures
Animal sculptures in Massachusetts
Bronze sculptures in Massachusetts
Dolphins in art
Outdoor sculptures in Boston